Christophe Dussart (born April 15, 1976 in Valenciennes) is a French football defender currently playing for French Championnat National side Nîmes Olympique.

His previous clubs include Valenciennes FC, Clermont Foot, FC Gueugnon and SCO Angers.

References

1976 births
Living people
Sportspeople from Valenciennes
French footballers
Valenciennes FC players
Clermont Foot players
FC Gueugnon players
Angers SCO players
Nîmes Olympique players
Association football defenders
Footballers from Hauts-de-France